is a Japanese manga written and illustrated by Kachiru Ishizue. The series has been serialized in Monthly Princess magazine since September 2017. The manga is licensed in English by Viz Media.

Plot
Stella Violetta was passing through a forest on her way to start a new job as a maid when she experiences a carriage accident. She awakens in a strange Gothic mansion occupied by four men: Levi-Ruin, Friedrich, Yoel, and Gilbert. They hire her to be their live-in maid and do not let her leave the grounds. After working there for a while, she soon discovers the four men are vampires who feed on young women to survive.

Publication
Rosen Blood is written and illustrated by Kachiru Ishizue. It began serialization in Akita Shoten's Monthly Princess magazine in September 2017. Its final chapter will be released in September 2022. It has been collected in five tankōbon volumes as of September 14, 2022.

In February 2021, Viz Media announced their license to the manga.

References

External links
 Official manga website
 Official website on Viz Media

2017 manga
Akita Shoten manga
Fantasy anime and manga
Romance anime and manga
Shōjo manga
Supernatural anime and manga
Vampires in anime and manga
Viz Media manga